Opener, Open'er or Openers may refer to:
 Opener (album), an album by 8mm
 Opener (baseball), a baseball strategy to use a relief pitcher to start a game
 Open'er Festival, a contemporary music festival held in Gdynia, Poland
 Bottle opener
 Can opener
 Conversation opener
 Opener, cricket player at the start of the batting order
 Openers, first poetry book from Roky Erickson, later followed by Openers II

See also
 Opening act, a performance by an introductory group prior to the main act